"Eyesight" is a song written and performed by James Brown. Released as a single in 1978, it charted #38 R&B. It also appeared on Brown's 1978 album Jam/1980's.

References

James Brown songs
Songs written by James Brown
1978 singles
1978 songs
Polydor Records singles